Portcullis Pursuivant of Arms in Ordinary is a junior officer of arms at the College of Arms in London.  The office is named after the Portcullis chained Or badge of the Beauforts, which was a favourite device of King Henry VII.  King Henry's mother was Lady Margaret Beaufort.  The office was instituted around 1485, probably at the time of Henry's coronation.  The badge of office is very similar to that of Somerset Herald of Arms in Ordinary, the latter being ensigned with the Royal Crown. The earliest recorded Portcullis Pursuivant was James or Jacques Videt, who was the plaintiff in a Common Pleas case in 1498 and again in 1500.

The current Portcullis Pursuivant of Arms in Ordinary is Dominic Ingram.

Holders of the office

See also
Pursuivant
Officer of Arms
College of Arms

References
Citations

Bibliography
 The College of Arms, Queen Victoria Street : being the sixteenth and final monograph of the London Survey Committee, Walter H. Godfrey, assisted by Sir Anthony Wagner, with a complete list of the officers of arms, prepared by H. Stanford London, (London, 1963)
 A History of the College of Arms &c, Mark Noble, (London, 1804)

External links
The College of Arms
CUHGS Officer of Arms Index

Offices of the College of Arms